Pua Khein-Seng (born 29 June 1974, is regarded in Malaysia as the inventor of USB flash drive. In an interview with The Star, the CEO of Phison Electronics Corp based in Taiwan claims to have incorporated the world's first single chip USB flash drive. He is even regarded as "father of pendrive" in Malaysia. Raised in Sekinchan, Selangor, Malaysia, Pua received his undergraduate education in electrical control engineering at the National Chiao Tung University, Taiwan and has since then resided in Taiwan.

References

1974 births
Living people
Malaysian businesspeople
Malaysian people of Chinese descent
Malaysian expatriates in Taiwan
National Chiao Tung University alumni
People from Selangor